Nuwan Shiroman (born 14 September 1974) is a Sri Lankan former cricketer. He played in 127 first-class and 75 List A matches between 1995/96 and 2010/11. He made his Twenty20 debut on 17 August 2004, for Sebastianites Cricket and Athletic Club in the 2004 SLC Twenty20 Tournament. Following his playing career, he became a cricket coach.

References

External links
 

1974 births
Living people
Sri Lankan cricketers
Badureliya Sports Club cricketers
Galle Cricket Club cricketers
Lankan Cricket Club cricketers
Sebastianites Cricket and Athletic Club cricketers
Sri Lanka Air Force Sports Club cricketers
Tamil Union Cricket and Athletic Club cricketers
Place of birth missing (living people)